Damian Baliński, in Polish media known as Damian Baliński Jr. (born 14 May 1989) is a former speedway rider who rode for Unia Leszno in the Speedway Ekstraliga.

Personal life 
His father, Dariusz (born 1965), was also a speedway rider. Damian's uncle, also named Damian (born 1977), is the 2007 Speedway World Cup winner.

Career history 
He passed speedway licence (Licencja "Ż") in 2005, as a 16-year-old. He rode for Unia Leszno in the 2005 Speedway Ekstraliga, scoring 0 points in 5 heats (2 matches). Unia Leszno finished fifth. Before the 2007 season he was loaned to Kolejarz Rawicz and won the Second League, scoring for his team 42 points and 6 bonus points in 37 heats (10 matches) - average 1.297. In September 2007 he declared the end of his career.

Career details

World Championships 
 Individual Under-21 World Championship
 2007 – lost in the Domestic Qualification (14th place in the Final)

European Championships 
 Individual Under-19 European Championship
 2007 – lost in the Domestic Qualification (17th place in the Final)

Polish Championships 

 Polish Pairs Under-21 Championship
 2007 – 5th place in the Semi-Final Two (3 pts in 3 heats) for Rawicz
 Team Polish Championship
 2005 – 5th place in the Ekstraliga for Unia Leszno (Average 0.000)
 2007 – Second League winner for Kolejarz Rawicz (Average 1.297)

Others competitions 
 Under-21 Silver Helmet
 2007 –  Rybnik – qualify to the Final as a track reserve, but windraw
 Under-19 Bronze Helmet
 2007 – nominated to the Semi-Final Two, but windraw

See also 
 Speedway in Poland

References

External links 
 Photo of Damian Baliński at SebaFoto.com
 Damian Baliński profile at zuzel.sport24.pl 

1989 births
Living people
Polish speedway riders
Place of birth missing (living people)